Hybrid was an extreme metal band formed in 2004 by musicians from other Madrid acts.

Biography

Hybrid was formed in March 2004 when Chus Maestro (One Last Word, Supra and formerly in Another Kind Of Death) recruited members from Human Mincer and Wormed to set up an extreme music project that would break down the walls of mainstream music. With Kike and Unai García, they began to write songs they later recorded in June 2005 as the band’s debut EP: Beyond Undeniable Entropy, a 6-song MCD of avant-garde, eclectic math metal, which was released the following year by Deadwrong Records.

The band has been playing live with Tool and Deftones at the Festimad Sur'06, as well as with Napalm Death, Cephalic Carnage, Textures,  Misery Index Moho, Machetazo and Looking For An Answer between others.

In the beginning of 2007 Hybrid entered Sadman Studio to record their first full-length album: The 8th Plague, mastered by Alan Douches (Mastodon, The Dillinger Escape Plan) with artwork by Seldon Hunt (Isis, Neurosis). The 8th Plague was released by English label Eyesofsound in August 2008.

Recently the band has been writing new material and is planning a new release scheduled for 2012. A live version of one of the songs to be released was added to YouTube on March 28, 2011.

Musical style
Hybrid’s music starts from a combination of technical death metal and avant-garde extreme metal in which they merge a big bunch of influences and nuances from diverse styles such as mathcore, grindcore, black metal, doom, crust and also free jazz and Latin music. They normally use odd time signatures, dissonances, polyrhythms, staccato riffing, blast beats, cuts, changes and contrasts that increase the unpredictableness of their music. Their composing method is based on the improvisation and the creative freedom. The band is also known for using different vocal ranges.

Lyrical content

Hybrid lyrics cover philosophical, sociological and spiritual themes from an apocalyptic, misanthropic and nihilistic point of view. The lyrics are written using metaphors and including references to The Bible, mythology, religion, mysticism, occultism, and psychology.

Members
Chus Maestro – drums, vocals (2004–2013)
Iván Durán – guitar (2008–2013)
Antonio Sanchez – guitar (2008–2013)

Past members
Kike – bass (2004–2008)
J. Oliver – guitar, vocals (2004–2008)
Migueloud – guitar, vocals (2004–2008)
Unai García – vocals (2004–2007)
Albano Fortes – vocals (2007–2008)
Iago Fuentes – bass (2008–2009)
Rafa – vocals (2008–2010)
Alfonso Vicente – bass (2009–2011)
Óscar Martín – vocals (2010)

Discography

Studio albums 
 The 8th Plague (album) (2008)
 Angst (2013)

EPs 
 Beyond Undeniable Entropy (2006)

Compilations
 Antichristmass Fest 2005 (Mondongo Caníbale, 2005)
 Xtreemities Vol. 6 (Xtreem Music, 2006)
 Madtaste Vol. 3 (Sur Music, 2006)
 22 Dósis de Psicoactivación (Rompiendo Records, 2007)
 Fear Candy Vol. 58 (Terrorizer, 2008)
 Spain Kills. Vol 8 (Xtreem Music, 2007)
 Various Sampler 2008 (Eyesofsound, 2008)

References

External links
 Hybrid at Myspace
 Hybrid official forum
 Eyesofsound label website

Musical groups established in 2004
Spanish death metal musical groups
Technical death metal musical groups
Spanish heavy metal musical groups